Szakály is a Hungarian surname:
 Dénes Szakály (born 1988), Hungarian football player
 Péter Szakály (born 1986, Nagyatád), Hungarian football (midfielder) player

It can also refer to a village in Tolna County, Hungary.

Hungarian-language surnames